Mesalina adrarensis is a species of sand-dwelling lizard in the family Lacertidae. The species is endemic to Mauritania.

References

adrarensis
Reptiles described in 2021